Sal's Pizza is a chain of Italian restaurants based in New England. The chain is owned by Sal's Group, owner of Salvatores, Mary's Pasta & Sandwiches, and Riverwalk Properties. The company operates as a franchise, which prepare a combined total of over 60,000 pizzas weekly.

History
Sal's Pizza first opened in Salem, New Hampshire, founded by Sal and Nick Lupoli in 1990. The first store opened at a time when Italian-based restaurant chains began to popularize. The store spawned franchises, and eventually grew to operate stores throughout the Boston and southern New Hampshire regions.
The company offers franchising, and they are known for offering a three-pound, 19-inch pizza.

See also
 List of pizza chains of the United States

References

Further reading

External links
 Official website

Economy of the Northeastern United States
Regional restaurant chains in the United States
Pizza chains of the United States
Companies based in New Hampshire
Restaurants established in 1990
1990 establishments in New Hampshire